The Loop in Kissimmee, Florida is an outdoor mall located at the corner of John Young Parkway and Osceola Parkway. It is split into two sections: Loop West and Loop East. Shops and attractions include a Regal Entertainment Group movie theater, Kohl's, JCPenney, Books A Million, Michael's, Nike Clearance Store, several speciality stores, and restaurants.

References

External links
Official website

Buildings and structures in Kissimmee, Florida
Shopping malls in Florida
Shopping malls established in 2007
2007 establishments in Florida